The 2014 season is FC Seoul's 31st season in the K League Classic.

Pre-season
 In Guam: From 7 January 2014 to 27 January 2014
 In Kagoshima, Japan: From 3 February 2016 to 17 February 2016

Pre-season match results

Competitions

Overview

K League Classic

League table

Results summary

Results by round

Matches

FA Cup

AFC Champions League

Group stage

Knockout stage

Round of 16

Quarter-finals

Semi-finals

Match reports and match highlights
Fixtures and Results at FC Seoul Official Website

Season statistics

K League Classic records

All competitions records

Attendance records

 Season total attendance is K League Classic, FA Cup, AFC Champions League in the aggregate and friendly match attendance is not included.

Squad statistics

Goals

Assists

Coaching staff

Players

Team squad
All players registered for the 2014 season are listed.

 (Discharged)

 (Out)
 (In)

 (Out)
 (In)

 (Conscripted)

 (Out)
 (Discharged)

 (Out)
 (In)
 (Out)
 (Discharged)

 (Out)
 (Discharged)
 (Discharged)

Out on loan & military service

 

 In : Transferred from other teams in the middle of season.
 Out : Transferred to other teams in the middle of season.
 Discharged : Transferred from Sangju Sangmu and Ansan Police for military service in the middle of season. (Registered in 2014 season)
 Conscripted : Transferred to Sangju Sangmu and Ansan Police for military service after end of season.

Transfers

In

Rookie Draft & Free Agent

 (Univ.) means player who go to university then back to FC Seoul.
 (After Univ.) means player who is joined FC Seoul after entering university.

Out

Loan & Military service

Tactics

Tactical analysis

Starting eleven and formation 
This section shows the most used players for each position considering a 3–4–2–1 or 3–4–3 formation.

Substitutes

See also
 FC Seoul

References

 FC Seoul 2014 Matchday Magazines

External links
 FC Seoul Official Website 

FC Seoul seasons
Seoul